The fourteenth generation Ford F-Series is a range of pickup trucks produced by Ford, introduced for the 2021 model year. This was the first generation to include a fully-electric and hybrid pickup truck among the offerings, with the F-150 Lightning model having entered production in 2022.

Sharing a strong visual resemblance to the previous generation, the 2021 F-150 underwent a redesign of 92% of its parts, carrying over only its cab and pickup box structure. The bed and cab configurations remain the same: regular cab and SuperCab trucks are available with  beds, while SuperCrew (crew cab) trucks are available with  beds. Along with exterior design changes to enhance aerodynamics, many changes were made to the interior, adding fold-flat front seats and larger touchscreens (including a fully digital instrument panel on higher-end trims).

The powertrain line is largely carried over from the previous generation, with a 3.3 L V6, 2.7 L and 3.5 L EcoBoost twin-turbo V6s, a 5.0 L V8, and a 3.0 L turbo diesel V6. However, the 5.0 L V8 receives a new cylinder deactivation system, called Variable Displacement Engine technology, similar to GM's Active Fuel Management and Chrysler's Multi-Displacement System. The 3.3 L V6's six-speed automatic was dropped, now being paired to a 10-speed automatic. New for this generation of F-150 is a gasoline-electric hybrid powertrain. Dubbed PowerBoost, this powertrain is the first to be offered in a Ford pickup truck, pairing an electric motor with the 3.5 L V6 EcoBoost engine.

Hybrid

Available only with the SuperCrew, the hybrid version of the F-150, called the PowerBoost, combines a 3.5 L EcoBoost V6 with a  hybrid motor/generator between the engine and transmission. A 1.5kWh lithium-ion battery pack is located under the bed. All the electrical power also allowed Ford to have up to 7200 watts in the bed of a truck, far exceeding the capacity of a normal 120V receptacle. A 20 percent fuel economy increase over a base 3.5 EcoBoost has been observed at combined city/highway driving. The hybrid option is $2,500 added to the base price, although it can be more depending on the trim.

 0–60mph acceleration: 5.4 seconds
 
 
 Payload: 
 Towing capacity: 
 two 120 V, 20 amp household outlets standard
 optional system with four 120 V, 20 amp household outlets and one 240 V, 30 amp NEMA L14-30R outlet

F-150 Lightning

Ford unveiled an electric version of the Ford F-150 called the F-150 Lightning, reviving the model name for the first time since the previous Lightning was discontinued after the 2004 model year.  It debuted on May 19, 2021, and deliveries to customers began in May 2022. The F-150 Lightning has dual motors. It is built at the new Ford Rouge Electric Vehicle Center in Michigan.

Ford had previously announced the intention to produce a fully-electric light pickup at the 2019 Detroit Auto Show in January 2019. Ford unveiled the truck, and released the model name—F-150 Lightning—on May 19, 2021.

Raptor

The F-150 Raptor was announced in February 2021, and features a 3.5 L twin-turbocharged V6 gasoline engine carried over from the previous generation.

Updates

For the 2022 model year, the F-150 saw several minor updates, alongside the major introduction of the electrified F-150 Lightning. Most notably, the 3.0 L Power Stroke turbo-diesel engine was discontinued because of low consumer demand. In addition, a new Black Appearance Package is available to order on XL (only with the optional STX package), XLT, Lariat, and Platinum trims.

For the 2023 model year, Ford launched a special F-150 Heritage Edition to honor the 75th anniversary of the first Ford F-Series pickup. The Heritage Edition, available only with the XLT trim, features special two-tone paint jobs in five different color combinations and exclusive seat coverings. The SuperCab was dropped from the Lariat trim, leaving only the SuperCrew available in either a 5-1/2 or 6-1/2 ft bed. Also for the 2023 model year, the F-150 Raptor R was introduced to compete with the Ram 1500 TRX.

Australian export
In March 2022, Ford announced plans to officially export the F-150 to Australia in 2023. Vehicles imported would be converted to right hand drive to conform to Australian Design Rules by RMA Automotive in Mickleham, Victoria. At launch, only the crew-cab body style with the XLT and Lariat trims would be offered and powered by the 3.5 L EcoBoost V6 mated to the 10-speed Ford 10R80 automatic.

Powertrains

● Still sold in selected markets outside North America

Safety

The 2022 F-150 was tested by the IIHS and its top trim received a Top Safety Pick award:

References

External links
 Official Ford F-150 website

14th generation
Pickup trucks
Motor vehicles manufactured in the United States
Cars introduced in 2020
2020s cars